Timothy McDonald (born January 6, 1965) is a former college and professional American football player who was a strong safety in the National Football League (NFL) for thirteen seasons during the 1980s and 1990s. McDonald played college football for the University of Southern California (USC), and was honored as a two-time All-American and two-time team MVP.  A second-round pick in the 1987 NFL Draft, McDonald played professionally for the St. Louis/Phoenix Cardinals (1987-1992) and San Francisco 49ers (1993-1999) of the NFL. Upon the conclusion of his playing career, McDonald entered coaching, most recently serving as the defensive backs coach for the New York Jets and the Buffalo Bills.

Early years
McDonald was born in Fresno, California.  He played high school football at Edison High School in Fresno.

At Edison, McDonald was named a prep All-American, All-California, All-Northern California, all-metro and league MVP at both safety and quarterback. He completed 56.9 percent of his passes for 2,739 yards and 30 touchdowns, and also rushed for 400 yards and six touchdowns. McDonald was also credited with five INTs and 123 tackles on defense.

College career
He attended the University of Southern California (USC), and majored in business administration at what is now the Marshall School of Business.  As a three-year starter, he accumulated 325 tackles and 11 interceptions. He was a consensus All-American as a junior in 1985 and a unanimous All-American as a senior in 1986, and followed a prominent list of All-American safeties who attended USC, such as Dennis Thurman, Ronnie Lott, Dennis Smith, Joey Browner, Charles Phillips, Artimus Parker, Mike Battle, and Mark Carrier.  McDonald is one of only six safeties named on the Walter Camp All-Century Team selected in 1999, celebrating the greatest college football players of the twentieth century. He was also a finalist as a senior for the Jim Thorpe Award and the Defensive Player of the Game in the 1987 East–West Shrine Game.

Professional career

He was drafted by the St. Louis Cardinals in the second round (34th pick overall) of the 1987 NFL Draft. In his six seasons with the Cardinals, Tim McDonald started 5 seasons. In those 5 seasons, he accounted for 605 tackles, 2.5 sacks, 20 int, 6 forced fumbles, 7 fumble recoveries, and a defensive touchdown. His best statistical season, and perhaps his finest season ever as a pro was in 1989 when he recorded a team-leading 155 tackles, 7 interceptions for 170 interception return yards,1 fumble recovery and an interception returned for a touchdown. He was named to 3 Pro Bowls and named All-Pro twice while with the Cardinals. He signed as a free agent by the San Francisco 49ers on April 7, 1993.

In 1993, McDonald would again perform at a high level being named to the NFC Pro Bowl squad. During that season, he donated $2,000 for every 49ers victory to the Boys and Girls Clubs of the Bay Area, netting $22,000 for those organizations. In 1994, McDonald helped the 49ers win Super Bowl XXIX. That season, McDonald recorded 76 tackles, 2 INTs, 7 passes defensed, 1 forced fumble, 1 fumble recovery, and 2 defensive touchdowns while being part of a San Francisco secondary that sent 3 players to the Pro Bowl, SS Tim McDonald, FS Merton Hanks, and NFL Defensive Player of the Year CB Deion Sanders. That season while teaming with free safety Merton Hanks, they would arguably become one of the best safety tandems in NFL history as they combined for 7 Pro Bowls and 5 All-Pro selections from 1994–1998 in 5 seasons respectively. McDonald continued his stellar play throughout his entire 49ers career until he retired after the 1999 season Being named to 3 Pro Bowls and named to 2nd team All-Pro twice. McDonald's finest statistical season as a 49er was in 1998 as he tallied 133 total tackles, 4 sacks, 4 INTs, 15 passes defensed, and 2 fumble recoveries.

Tim McDonald was known for being a great all-around safety and one of the better tacklers and hitters at strong safety during his playing career. After 191 games, he had tallied 40 career interceptions, 9.5 sacks, 16 recovered fumbles, and 4 touchdowns. McDonald retired as a Super Bowl Champion and played in 6 Pro Bowls, three times with each team.

Coaching career
McDonald coached youth football leading the Malloch Elementary football team to two undefeated seasons from 2001–2003. McDonald coached for his alma mater Edison High School in Fresno, where he coached his sons, Timothy McDonald, Jr. and Tevin McDonald. McDonald left Edison High in the 2010 football season, but came back for 2011 and putting Edison back at the top. McDonald left Edison High in 2012 and was signed as a secondary coach for Fresno State. After one season at Fresno State Mcdonald was signed as a DB coach for the New York Jets under Rex Ryan. He followed Ryan to the Buffalo Bills in 2015, where he served as defensive backs coach for two years.

Personal life
McDonald and wife Alycia have two sons, Timothy, Jr. (TJ) and Tevin, and one daughter Taryn. TJ played safety at his father's alma mater, USC, and was drafted by the St. Louis Rams in the 3rd round of the 2013 draft. He signed with the Miami Dolphins as a free agent in 2017. Tevin played 2 seasons with crosstown rival, UCLA. Tevin was dismissed from UCLA, Jim Mora citing his release as a violation of team rules and transferred to Eastern Washington University; he went undrafted in the 2015 draft and was signed by the Oakland Raiders as a free agent.

References

1965 births
Living people
American football safeties
Buffalo Bills coaches
Fresno State Bulldogs football coaches
New York Jets coaches
Phoenix Cardinals players
San Francisco 49ers players
St. Louis Cardinals (football) players
USC Trojans football players
High school football coaches in California
All-American college football players
National Conference Pro Bowl players
Sportspeople from Fresno, California
Players of American football from California